Kiladi Kittu is a 1978 Indian Kannada-language film directed by K.S.R. Das. The film starred Vishnuvardhan and Rajinikanth. The music for the film was composed by Mohan Kumar. The director remade the movie in Telugu in 1981 as Black Cobra.

Cast
 Vishnuvardhan as Kittu
 Rajinikanth as Inspector Srikanth
 Leelavathi
 Pandhari Bai
 Kavitha
 Vajramuni
 B. Jaya
 Shivaram 
 Baby Jayashree
 Narasimha Raju as Achchanna
 T. N. Balakrishna as Muttanna
 Shakti Prasad
 Ratnakar
 Chetan Ram Rao
 Mysore Lokesh
 Fighter Shetty

Soundtrack
The music of Kiladi Kittu was composed by Mohan Kumar.

References

External links
 

1970s Kannada-language films
Films directed by K. S. R. Das
Kannada films remade in other languages